
Pugu is the sun god of the Yukaghir of Siberia. Like many other solar gods, he was also seen as a god of justice and law.  He is revered as the defender of the oppressed and the punisher of evil deeds. He kills evil demons with his sun-flail in hopes of bringing peace to his land.He is mostly known in the continent Asia,but Pugu is mildly known also in the Arabic and European worlds. He resembles a humanoid figure, but some cultures depict it as a dog, especially the breed Pug, because the dog is often depicted in Asian cultures as a loyal protecting friend. He is not very often depicted as a god of protection and war sportsmanship. Kinda also resembling the"dog"form of the deity.

He is also identified as Ye'loje, who looked after the oppressed and kept an eye on behavior and morals.

References

Citations

Bibliography
 

Siberian deities
Yukaghir people
Dogs
Asian gods

Solar gods
Justice gods